The Highland Park Manufacturing Company Mill No. 3 is a historic textile mill complex and national historic district located at 2901 N. Davidson St. in Charlotte, Mecklenburg County, North Carolina.  The district encompasses included five contributing buildings and are the original mill building (1903-1904) and major weaving room addition (c. 1946), Gate House (c. 1904, 1920), Dye House (c. 1925), Boiler House (c. 1903-1904), and Waste House (1903-1904). The original mill was designed by Stuart W. Cramer and features a four-story tower capped by fancy corbelling and crenelated parapets.

The building is located in the North Charlotte Historic District. It was listed on the National Register of Historic Places in 1988.  Currently, the building had been converted into an apartment complex named Highland Mill Lofts.

References

Textile mills in North Carolina
Industrial buildings and structures on the National Register of Historic Places in North Carolina
Historic districts on the National Register of Historic Places in North Carolina
Buildings and structures completed in 1903
Buildings and structures in Mecklenburg County, North Carolina
National Register of Historic Places in Mecklenburg County, North Carolina